Earl Carl Slipher (March 25, 1883 – August 7, 1964) was an American astronomer, and politician. He was the brother of astronomer Vesto Slipher. He served in both the Arizona House of Representatives and the Arizona State Senate.

Biography
Slipher was born in Mulberry, Indiana. He first joined Lowell Observatory in 1908 and became a noted planetary astronomer, concentrating on Mars. He published Photographic History of Mars (1905–1961). In 1957, he appeared in the "Mars and Beyond" episode of Disneyland discussing the possibility of life on Mars.

He also served as mayor of Flagstaff, Arizona from 1918 to 1920, and later as a member of the Arizona state legislature until 1933.

The crater Slipher on the Moon is named after Earl and Vesto Slipher, as is asteroid 1766 Slipher, discovered September 7, 1962, by the Indiana Asteroid Program.

He served a two terms in the Arizona State Senate during the 8th and 10th Arizona State Legislatures, holding the seat from Coconino County. He was also a member of the Arizona House of Representatives, from Coconino County, during the 7th Arizona State Legislature.

References

External links

Biography

1883 births
1964 deaths
American astronomers
Planetary scientists
Mayors of places in Arizona
People from Clinton County, Indiana
People from Flagstaff, Arizona
Democratic Party members of the Arizona House of Representatives
20th-century American politicians
Democratic Party Arizona state senators